Place names in Australia have names originating in the Australian Aboriginal languages for three main reasons:
 Historically, European explorers and surveyors may have asked local Aboriginal people the name of a place, and named it accordingly. Where they did not ask, they may have heard the place was so-named. Due to language difficulties, the results were often misheard and misunderstood names, such as the name of the Yarra River. There are a suspicious number of place names which translate as pretty and resting place, which may imply European romanticism, and no doubt a good deal of mispronunciation and corruption in general.
 Australian governments have officially named many places, particularly suburbs, after Aboriginal people or language groups, such as Aranda or Tullamarine.
 The place name has always been called thus by Aboriginal people, and Aboriginal people still live in the area. This is particularly so for Aboriginal communities, such as Maningrida in the Northern Territory. This is more frequent where non-indigenous settlement has been less dense, particularly in Central Australia and the Top End.

Watkin Tench, who arrived on the First Fleet in 1788, observed of the Aboriginal languages of the present-day Sydney area:
"We were at first inclined to stigmatise this language as harsh and barbarous in its sounds. Their combinations of words in the manner they utter them, frequently convey such an effect. But if not only their proper names of men and places, but many of their phrases and a majority of their words, be simply and unconnectedly considered, they will be found to abound with vowels and to produce sounds sometimes mellifluous and sometimes sonorous. What ear can object to the names of Colbee (pronounced exactly as Colby is with us), Bereewan, Bondel, Imeerawanyee, Deedora, Wolarawaree, or Baneelon, among the men; or to Wereeweea, Gooreedeeana, Milba, or Matilba, among the women? Parramatta, Gweea, Cameera, Cadi, and Memel, are names of places. The tribes derive their appellations from the places they inhabit. Thus Cemeeragal, means the men who reside in the bay of Cameera; Cadigal, those who reside in the bay of Cadi; and so of the others."

Towns and suburbs

→A←
Adaminaby
Adelong
Ajana
Adelong
Akuna Bay
Aldinga
Allambie
Allambie Heights
Allanooka
Allawah
Allora
Amaroo
Amelup
Anembo
Angledool
Angourie
Angurugu
Anula
Arakoon
Araluen
Arana Hills
Aranda
Aratula
Ardmona
Areyonga
Argalong
Arrawarra
Arrino
Attunga
Aurukun
Awaba
 
→B←
Baandee
Babakin
Badgebup
Badgingarra
Badjaling
Bailup
Baladjie
Balagundi
Balarang
Balbarrup
Balcatta
Balga
Balgarri
Balingup
Ballarat
Balkuling
Ballaballa
Bamaga
Banya
Banyo
Barangaroo
Bardoc
Bargo
Baringa
Barra Brui (East Gordon)
Barraba
Barragup
Baryulgil
Beerburrum
Beechina
Beeliar
Beerwah
Bega
Bellambi
Bellara
Bellata
Bejoording
Belka
Belmunging
Bemboka
Benalla
Bencubbin
Bendering
Benjaberring
Berala
Berrara
Beria
Bermagui
Berowra
Berri
Bewong Creek
Bilbarin
Billimari
Biloela
Binalong
Bindi Bindi
Bindoon
Binnaway
Binningup
Binna Burra
Binnu
Birralee
Birrong
Birtinya
Bli Bli
Bodalla
Bodallin
Buddina
Bogan Gate
Boggabilla
Boggabri
Bolaro
Bolgart
Bolong
Bomaderry
Bombala
Bombo
Bondi
Bong Bong
Bongaree
Boodarockin
Boogardie
Boolading
Boolaroo
Booligal
Boonoo Boonoo
Boorabbin
Booragoon
Boorara
Boorowa
Boreen Point
Bowelling
Bowgada
Bowral
Boya
Boyanup
Boyup Brook
Bredbo
Brewarrina
Broulee
Brundee
Buderim
Budgewoi
Bulimba
Bullaring
Bulli
Buln Buln
Bullaburra
Bulong
Bung Bong
Bundamba
Bundanoon
Bundeena
Bungulla
Bunjil
Bunyip
Burakin
Buraja
Burekup
Burpengary
Buronga
Burracoppin
Burran Rock
Burraneer
Buttaba

→C←
Caboolture
Cabramatta
Cabramurra
Calga
Calingiri
Caiguna
Callala
Caloundra
Cammeray
Canbelego
Canberra
Candelo
Canna
Carbunup River
Cardup
Caringbah
Carnamah
Caron
Carrabin
Carramar
Chinocup
Chittering
Clackline
Clybucca
Cobargo
Cocklebiddy
Collarenebri
Collaroy
Conargo
Condingup
Congelin
Coodanup
Coogee
Coogee
Cookernup
Coolac
Coolah
Coolamon
Coolangatta
Coolbellup
Coolbinia
Coolgardie
Coolimba
Cooloongup
Coolup
Cooma
Coomalbidgup
Coonabarabran
Coonamble
Coonawarra
Cooran
Coorow
Cooroy
Cootamundra
Coraki
Coramba
Cordering
Corowa
Corrigin
Corrimal
Corryong
Couridjah
Corindi
Cowandilla 
Cowaramup
Cowcowing
Cowra
Cringila
Cronulla
Cuballing
Cuddingwarra
Cudgewa
Cudmirrah
Culburra
Cullacabardee
Cunderdin
Cunjerong Point
Curl Curl
Currambine
Currarong
Currumbin
Currumundi
 
→D←
Dalaroo
Dalwallinu
Dalyup
Dandaragan
Dandenong
Dangin
Dardanup
Darkan
Dapto
Dattening
Deniliquin
Derrimut
Dharruk
Diddillibah
Dinninup
Dimbulah
Dirranbandi
Doonan
Drik Drik
Drouin
Dongara
Doodlakine
Dooralong
Dowerin
Dubbo
Dudinin
Dukin
Dumbleyung
Dungog
Duranillin
Duri
Dwarda
Dwellingup
 
→E←
Echuca
Echunga
Ejanding
Elanora
Eleebana
Eneabba
Eradu
Erina
Ettalong
Ettamogah
Eucla
Eugowra
Eujinyn
Eulaminna
Eumundi
Eungai
Euroa
Eurobodalla
Eurunderee
 
→G←
Gabanintha
Gabbin
Gagalba
Galong
Ganmain
Garah
Geelong
Gerogery
Gerringong
Gidgegannup
Gilgandra
Gindalbie
Gingin
Ginninderra
Giralang
Girrawheen
Gnangara
Gnowangerup
Goodna
Goodooga
Gooloogong
Goomalling
Goondi
Goondiwindi
Goonellabah
Goonengerry
Goongarrie
Goonoo Goonoo
Goornong
Girraween
Grong Grong
Gulargambone
Gunbalanya
Gudarra
Gulgong
Gullewa
Gundagai
Gundamaian
Gundaroo
Gungahlin
Gunnedah
Gunyidi
Guyra
Gwambygine
Gwelup
Gymea
 
→H←
Howatharra
Howlong
 
→I←
Illaroo
Illalong
Illawong
Iluka
Inala
Indooroopilly
Ingebyra
Innaloo
Imbil
 
→J←
Jamberoo
Jandabup
Jannali
Jardee
Jeebropilly
Jennacubbine
Jeparit
Jerangle
Jerdacuttup
Jerrabomberra
Jerramungup
Jimboomba
Jincumbilly
Jindabyne
Jindalee, Queensland
Jindalee
Jingalup
Jindabyne
Jindera
Jingellic
Jitarning
Joondalup
Jugiong

→K←
Kalamunda
Kalannie
Kalbarri
Kaleen
Kalgan
Kalgoorlie
Kallangur
Kallaroo
Kalli
Kambah
Kambalda
Kameruka
Kanahooka
Kangy Angy
Kanowna
Kanwal
Karawara
Karrabin
Karingal
Karangi
Kardinya
Kareela
Kariong
Karlgarin
Karnup
Karragullen
Karrakatta
Karrakup
Karratha
Karridale
Karrinyup
Karuah
Karumba
Katanning
Katoomba
Kauring
Kebaringup
Kellerberrin
Kemblawarra
Kendenup
Keperra
Kerang
Khancoban
Kiah
Kiama
Kiara
Kiewa
Kiley
Killara
Kirrawee
Kirribilli
Kirup
Kogarah
Kojonup
Kokardine
Konnongorring
Koo Wee Rup
Koojan
Koolan
Koolanooka
Koolewong
Koolyanobbing
Koonawarra
Koondoola
Koongamia
Koorda
Kooragang
Koreelah
Korrelocking
Kooringal
Korumburra
Kotara
Kowanyama
Krambach
Kudardup
Kukerin
Kulikup
Kulin
Kulja
Kulyalling
Kumari
Kundana
Kunjin
Kununoppin
Kununurra
Kuranda
Kurnalpi
Kurnell
Kurrawang
Kweda
Kwelkan
Kwinana
Kwolyin
Kyancutta
Kyogle
Kurri Kurri
Kyabram
Kyeemagh
Kywong
 
→L←
Lake Cooroibah
Lameroo
Lang Lang
Larrakeyah
Legana
Leongatha
Leumeah
Leura
Liawenee
Lilli Pilli
Loorana
Lurnea
 
→M←
Magati Ke
Malanda
Maleny
Mallina
Malua Bay
Manangatang
Mandiga
Mandogalup
Manera Heights
Mandurah
Mandurama
Mandurang
Maningrida
Manildra
Manilla
Manjimup
Manmanning
Maralinga
Marangaroo
Marayong
Marbelup
Marchagee
Mardella
Mareeba
Marmong Point
Maroochydore
Maroota
Maroubra
Mareeba
Marree
Maribyrnong
Mariginiup
Mathoura
Matong
Maya
Mayanup
Maydena
Meckering
Meekatharra
Meenaar
Mendooran
Menindee
Merimbula
Merredin
Merriwa
Merrygoen
Mia Mia
Michelago
Miling
Millaa Millaa
Millmerran
Milparinka
Milperra
Mindarie
Minnamurra
Mingenew
Minyip
Mirrabooka
Mittagong
Moama
Moe
Mogo
Monbulk
Mollymook
Moodiarrup
Moojebing
Mooloolaba
Moonah
Moonbi
Mooloolaba
Mooney Mooney
Moonijin
Moora
Moorabbin
Moorine Rock
Moornaming
Moorooka
Mooroolbark
Mooroopna
Moorumbine
Morawa
Mordialloc
Moree
Moruya
Moulyining
Mount Colah
Mount Ku-ring-gai
Mount Warrigal
Muchea
Mudgee
Mudjimba
Muja
Mukinbudin
Mulgarrie
Mulgoa
Mullaloo
Mullalyup
Mullengandra (formerly Mullanjandra)
Mullewa
Mulline
Mullumbimby
Mulwarrie
Mundaring
Mundijong
Mundubbera
Mungindi
Mungalup
Munglinup
Muntadgin
Murarrie
Muradup
Murdunna
Murrin Murrin
Murrumba Downs
Murrumbeena
Murrumburrah
Murrurundi
Murwillumbah
Myalup
Myaree
 
→N←
Nabawa
Nabiac
Nalkain
Nalya
Nambrok
Nambucca
Nana Glen
Nangeenan
Nannine
Nannup
Naracoopa
Naraling
Narara
Nareena Hills
Narembeen
Naremburn
Narkal
Narooma
Narwee
Narrabeen
Narrabri
Narrabundah
Narrandera
Nar Nar Goon
Narngulu
Narrabundah
Narrandera
Narrawallee
Narre Warren
Narraweena
Narrikup
Narrogin
Narromine
Needilup
Neendaling
Neerabup
Nelligen
Nemingha
Nerriga
Nerrigundah
Ngunnawal
Nhulunbuy
Ningi
Nippering
Nirimba
Noarlunga
Noggerup
Nollamara
Noojee
Noongal
Noongar
Noosa
North Dandalup
North Yunderup
Nowergup
Nowra
Nugadong
Nullagine
Numbah
Nungarin
Nungatta
Nunngarra
Nuriootpa
Nyabing
Nyngan
 
→O←
Omeo
Ongerup
Ourimbah
Ouyen
 
→P←
Pambula
Papunya
Panania
Pannawonica
Parraburdoo
Paringa
Parramatta
Patchewollock
Patonga
Pawleena
Pegarah
Pemulwuy
Penna
Perenjori
Peringillup
Pialligo
Piawaning
Pindar
Pingaring
Pingelly
Pingrup
Pinjar
Pinjarra
Pintharuka
Pinwernying
Pithara
Poatina
Pooncarrie
Pootenup
Popanyinning
Pormpuraaw
Porongurup
Primbee
Pyree
 
→Q←
Quaama
Quairading
Qualeup
Quambone
Queanbeyan
Quandialla
Quigup
Quindalup
Quindanning
Quirindi
 
→R←
Ramingining
Reekara
 
→S←
South Kumminin
South Yunderup
 
→T←
Tahmoor
Talbingo
Tallangatta
Tallawarra
Tambellup
Tammin
Tangambalanga
Tanilba Bay
Tanunda
Tarago
Taralga
Taranna
Tarcutta
Taree
Taringa
Taroo
Taroona
Tarragindi
Tarraleah
Tarrawanna
Tarzali
Tathra
Telarah
Tenindewa
Teralba
Terara
Terrigal
Tewantin
Tharwa
Thirroul
Thredbo
Thurgoona
Tibooburra
Tilpa
Timbillica
Tincurrin
Tingalpa
Tingha
Tintaldra
Tolga
Tomerong
Tongarra
Toodyay
Toogoolawah
Toukley
Toolibin
Tooloom
Toombul
Toongabbie
Toowong
Toowoomba
Toolijooa
Toowong
Toukley
Towradgi
Towrang
Trangie
Trayning
Tuckanarra
Tuggerah
Tuggeranong
Tuggerawong
Tullimbar
Tumbarumba
Tumbi Umbi
Tumblong
Tumut
Tuncurry
Tura Beach
Turlinjah
Turramurra
 
→U←
Uki
Umina
Unanderra
Uraidla
Uriarra
Uralla
Urana
Urunga
 
→W←
Wadalba
Waddamanna
Wadderin
Wagaman
Wagerup
Wagga Wagga
Wagin
Wahroonga
Walbundrie
Walcha
Walgoolan
Walla Walla
Wallabadah
Wallangarra
Wallerawang
Walwa
Wamberal
Wanaaring
Wandandian
Wandering
Wandi
Wandoan
Wangaratta
Wangi Wangi
Wannamal
Wannanup
Wanneroo
Wantirna
Waramanga
Warana
Waratah
Warimoo
Waroona
Warrachuppin
Warragul
Warralakin
Warrandyte
Warrawong
Warrnambool
Warumbul
Watheroo
Wee Waa
Welbungin
Werombi
Weetangera
Werribee
West Toodyay
Wialki
Wickepin
Widgiemooltha
Wilcannia
Wilga
Wilkawatt
Willagee
Willunga
Wiluna
Windang
Windellama
Wingala
Wingello
Wodalba
Wodonga
Wogarl
Wokalup
Wollombi
Wollomombi
Wollongong
Wooloowin
Wonboyn
Wongai
Wongan Hills
Wonnerup
Woodanilling
Woodarra
Woolgoolga
Wooli
Woollahra
Woolloomooloo
Woolloongabba
Woongarra
Woori Yallock
Woorim
Wombarra
Wongawilli
Woodenbong
Woolgoolga
Woollamia
Woomargamah
Woomera
Woonona
Wooroloo
Wonthaggi
Worrigee
Woy Woy
Wubin
Wujal Wujal
Wulkuraka
Wundowie
Wurtulla
Wyalkatchem
Wyee
Wyening
Wymah
Wyong
Wyongah
 
→Y←
Yackandandah
Yagoona
Yalgoo
Yallah
Yallakool
Yallambie
Yalup Brook
Yalwal
Yamba
Yambacoona
Yanchep
Yanco
Yandanooka
Yanderra
Yandina
Yarrahapinni
Yerrinbool
Yangebup
Yanmah
Yannawah
Yannergee
Yantabulla
Yarding
Yarloop
Yaroomba
Yarrabah
Yarrabandai
Yarralumla
Yarram
Yarramalong
Yarraman
Yarrawarrah
Yarrawonga
Yarra Bay
Yarri
Yatala
Yattalonga
Yatte Yattah
Yealering
Yeerongpilly
Yelbeni
Yellowdine
Yeppoon
Yerecoin
Yeronga
Yerrinbool
Yilliminning
Yirrkala
Yokine
Yolla
Yoogali
Yornaning
Yoting
Youanmi
Youndegin
Yoweragabbie
Yowie Bay
Yowrie
Yuendumu
Yulara
Yullundry
Yuluma
Yuna
Yundamindera
Yungaburra
Yunndaga

Regions and shires not named after town, river, etc.

Banyule City Council
Baryulgil
Barrenjoey
Boroondara City Council
Buloke Shire
Corangamite Shire
Demondrille Shire (abolished)
Eurobodalla Shire
Gannawarra Shire
Illawarra
Ku-ring-gai Municipality
Moorabool Shire
Mulwaree Shire (abolished)
Murrumbidgee
Murrundindi Shire
Ngaanyatjarraku
Nillumbik Shire
Orana Region
Pilbara
Warringah Shire
Yarriambiack Shire

Natural features

Beaches (not named after town or suburb) 
Belongil
Bouddi
Bulgo Beach
Bungan
Elouera
Era Beach (North and South)
Garie Beach
Tamarama Beach
Wanda
Wattamolla
Werri Beach
Werrong Beach

Bays 
Akuna
Careel
Curracurrang Cove
Curracurrong Cove
Erowal Bay
Gunamatta
Malua
Myuna Bay
Tanilba Bay
Toowoon
Waratah
Yowie

Lakes 
Budgewoi
Bungunnia
Burrendong
Burrill Lake
Cargelligo
Lake Canobolas
Catagunyah
Lake Conjola
Coomaditchy Lagoon
Coongie
Etamunbanie
Minigwal
Lake Mokoan (now demolished)
Moondah
Lake Mulwala
Lake Munmorah
Noondie
Parangana
Lake Tabourie
Tuggerah
Uloowaranie
Yamma Yamma
Yantabangee
Yarra Yarra

Rivers 
Barcoo
Barwon
Bega
Belubula River
Belyando
Bemboka River
Bogan
Bokhara River
Bombala
Boorowa River
Brogo River
Bulloo
Bungala
Capertee River
Colo
Coolaburragundy
Crackenback River
Cudgegong
Culgoa
Eucumbene River
Goobarragandra River
Goolwa
Gudgenby River
Kalang River
Kalgan
Kedumba River
Kolan
Kowmung River
Maranoa River
Maribyrnong
Maroochy
Mehi
Minnamurra
Mitta Mitta
Molonglo
Mooki
Moonie
Muleurundi (supplanted by use of name MacDonald River, Bendemeer)
Munyang River
Murrumbidgee
Myponga
Nambucca
Namoi
Narram
Nattai River
Nerang River
Nogoa
Noosa River
Nowendoc River
Nymboida

Onkaparinga
Orara
Pallinup
Paroo
Parramatta
Queanbeyan
Ringarooma
Talbragar
Tamar
Tambo
Tooma River
Tumut River
Wallagaraugh River
Warragamba River
Warrego
Willochra
Wingecarribee River
Wolgan River
Wollondilly River
Woronora
Yankalilla
Yappar
Yarra
Yass (corruption of Ngunnawal word Yarh)

Creeks 
Cabramatta
Cockabutta
Currumbene Creek
Eungai
Kinchela Creek
Mingera
Mullum Mullum
Tantawangalo Creek
Wallarah Creek
Wollemi
Wongo
Djerriwarrh

Islands
Kooragang Island

Mountains, ranges etc

Mount Baranduda
Mount Baw Baw
Beerwah
Mount Bimberi
Bindook Tableland
Mount Bingar
Bogong High Plains
Boorowa River (formerly Burrowa)
Brindabella Range
Budawang Range
Mount Buller
Bungle Bungle Range
Bunya Mountains
Burrup Peninsula
Bywong Hills
Caloola Pass
Mount Canobolas
Chincogan
Conimbla Range
Coonoowrin
Mount Dandenong
Dandenong Ranges
Dargo High Plains
Dederang Gap
Mount Goonaneman
Kanangra Walls
Mount Kaputar
Kata Tjuta
Keajura Gap
Mount Keira
Mount Kembla
Kyeamba Gap
Moonbi Range
Mount Moonbil
Mumbulla Mountain
Munghorn Gap
Nandewar Range
Mount Nardi
Tibrogargan
Mount Tilga
Tinderry Range
Mount Ulandra
Uluru
Mount Wandera
Watagan Mountains
Warrumbungle Range
Wilpena Pound
Wollumbin (Mount Warning)
Wundu (Thornton's Peak)
Mount Yarrahapinni
You Yangs

Deserts
Tanami Desert
Tirari Desert

Caves
Bendethera
Bungonia
Colong
Coolamon
Jenolan
Tuglow
Yarrongobilly
Borenore

Dams 
Bendora
Blowering
Burrendong
Burrinjuck
Corin
Eucumbene
Googong
Jounama Pondage
Pindari
Tantangara
Wyangala

Parks and forests

National parks

Arakwal
Barool
Baw Baw
Bendidee
Boonoo Boonoo
Bouddi
Budawang
Burrowa
Canunda
Coopracambra
Coorong
Croajingolong
Currawinya
Dharug National Park
Dipperu
Dunggir
Eurobodalla
Garigal
Japoon
Kakadu
Karijini
Kuringgai
Marramarra
Muogamarra Nature Reserve
Nangar
Nattai
Nymboida
Onkaparinga River
Porongurup
Purnululu
Tamborine
Tarra-Bulga
Terrick Terrick
Uluru-Kata Tjuta
Witjira
Wollemi
Wyrrabalong
Yarra Ranges
Yengo National Park

Nature reserves
Muogamarra

State forests

Bago
Barmah
Belanglo
Bodalla
Bondo
Buckenbowra
Buckingbong
Bulga
Bullala
Bungongo
Burrawan
Chaelundi
Cobaw
Cobboboonee
Colymea
Conjola
Corrabare
Croobyar
Currambine
Currowan
Dingo
Drajurk
Etoo
Ewingar
Gibberagee
Gilwarny
Goonoo
Grahway
Ingalba
Jenolan
Kioloa
Malara
Maragle
Moruya
Murrah
Nerong
Ourimbah
Pilliga
Pokolbin
Riamukka
Tallaganda
Tamban
Tillarook
Toolangi
Tuggolo
Wang Wauk
Weecurra
Wingello
Wombat
Woomargama
Wyong
Yadboro
Yalwal
Yarratt

State Conservation Areas
Whian Whian

Highways and main roads
Ballambur Street
Ballandella Road
Barrenjoey Road
Belconnen Way
Bindubi Street
Bunnerong Road
Canberra Avenue
Coranderrk Street
Ginninderra Drive
Gundaroo Drive
Gungahlin Drive
Jerrabomberra Avenue
Kamilaroi Highway
Majura Parkway
Maroondah Highway
Milperra Road
Mirrabei Drive
Monaro Highway
Namitjira Drive
Oodnadatta Track
Tharwa Drive
Tuggeranong Parkway
Warrego Highway
Warrigal Road
Warringah Road
Woniora Road
Yamba Drive

Non-Aboriginal place names that are assumed to be Aboriginal 

Aramac (a corruption of the name Robert Ramsey Mackenzie, Premier of Queensland)
Bellingen (three towns in Germany carry this name)
Wangara ((Wan(neroo)) + (Gnan)gara)

Place names over which uncertainty exists
Bruthen – a Celtic place name used in Britain (now named Breidden), between Shropshire, England and Powys, Wales; also a Scott's Gaelic word meaning striped or checked; and in Cornish the word means freckled or speckled.
Bodalla – a corruption of "boat alley".
Narrabeen – a corruption of "narrow bean".
Traralgon
Ulladulla – a corruption of "holey dollar".
Warracknabeal
Watanobbi – could be from Watanabe, Japanese surname, or a description of the hill to which the word refers.

See also
List of reduplicated Australian place names
-up, a Noongar-based suffix, common to many south western Western Australia place names

References

Australian Aboriginal languages
Australian place names
Australian Aboriginal
Australian
Australian toponymy